Dingleya is a genus of truffles in the Tuberaceae family. The genus contains seven species found in Australia. Circumscribed by James Trappe in 1979, the genus is named after New Zealand mycologist Joan Dingley.

References

External links
 

Pezizales
Truffles (fungi)
Pezizales genera
Taxa named by James Trappe